Issac Vanmalsawma Chhakchhuak (born 15 September 1996) is an Indian professional footballer who plays as a midfielder for Odisha in the Indian Super League.

Club career

Shillong Lajong
In 2014, Isaac signed on the dotted lines for Shillong lajong. In 2015–16 I-League season he was registered with senior team and there he has played 5 matches in entire season.

2016–17 season
In 2016–17 I-League season, Lajong coach Thangboi Singto used Isaac as offensive midfielder and sometimes as a right winger. He played all matches and scored on two occasions. Isaac was instrumental part of Shillong Lajong squad which showed decent performance throughout 2016–17 season.

Pune City
On 23 July 2017, Isaac has been picked up by FC Pune City for 2017–18 ISL season.

Chennaiyin
In June 2018, Isaac has signed with Chennaiyin for two year deal. Issac scored his maiden goal in ISL with the Marina Machans against ATK.

International career

Youth
In October 2013, Isaac went to Qatar to represent India U19 in AFC U19 Championship Qualifiers. Where he played all 3 matches under coach Colm Toal.

Senior
Isaac has been included in the national team setup since a very young age and is a very versatile player, playing either on the wing or as offensive midfielder. He made his India debut against Bhutan. Isaac was called for India senior team camp for AFC Asian Cup Qualifiers match against Kyrgyzstan.

Career statistics

Club

References

1996 births
Living people
People from Lunglei
Indian footballers
Shillong Lajong FC players
Association football midfielders
Footballers from Mizoram
I-League players
AIFF Elite Academy players
Indian Super League players
FC Pune City players
Chennaiyin FC players
Jamshedpur FC players
Odisha FC players